

270001–270100 

|-bgcolor=#f2f2f2
| colspan=4 align=center | 
|}

270101–270200 

|-bgcolor=#f2f2f2
| colspan=4 align=center | 
|}

270201–270300 

|-bgcolor=#f2f2f2
| colspan=4 align=center | 
|}

270301–270400 

|-id=373
| 270373 William ||  || William Edmonds (born 1945), a software engineer at NASA || 
|}

270401–270500 

|-id=472
| 270472 Csörgei ||  || Tibor Csörgei (born 1972), a Slovak amateur astronomer and observer of meteors, comets and asteroids. || 
|}

270501–270600 

|-id=553
| 270553 Loureed ||  || Lou Reed (1942–2013), an American musician, singer and songwriter || 
|-id=556
| 270556 Kolonica ||  || Kolonica, a small Slovak village near the location of the 1-meter Vihorlat National Telescope (VNT) at Kolonica Saddle (Src). Kolonica's inhabitants were very helpful during the observatory construction and still participate often in astronomical activities. || 
|}

270601–270700 

|-
| 270601 Frauenstein ||  || Frauenstein, a small city on the crest of the Erzgebirge Mountains in Saxony, Germany. || 
|}

270701–270800 

|-id=725
| 270725 Evka ||  || Eva Morvayová (born 1979), a Slovak amateur astronomer and visual observer, who is a member of the Astronomy Club in Nové Zámky, Slovakia. || 
|}

270801–270900 

|-bgcolor=#f2f2f2
| colspan=4 align=center | 
|}

270901–271000 

|-id=903
| 270903 Pakstiene ||  || Erika Pakstiene (born 1971), a Lithuanian astronomer and expert in stellar photometry of variable stars, eclipsing binaries, transiting exoplanets, microlensed objects, and rotating asteroids. Known for her work in asteroseismology of variable stars, she has authored more than 80 scientific papers and written many popular science articles. || 
|}

References 

270001-271000